

Events
Probably Aimeric de Peguilhan wrote , a planh for Raymond Berengar IV of Provence

Births

Deaths

13th-century poetry
Poetry